Kolporter Korona Kielce may refer to:

 Kolporter Kielce, women's handball team playing in the Polish Ekstraklasa Women's Handball League
 Korona Kielce, men's Polish football team